Haryana Olympic Association (HOA) is an autonomous body of sports in Indian state of Haryana which is affiliated with Indian Olympic Association. Founded in 1966, HOA is apex sports body working for the promotion and development of sports in the Haryana.

HOA Presidents

HOA Executive Committee

State Sports Associations

IOC Permanent Olympic Sports
Following are state sports association governing the Permanent Olympic Sports.

Disputes
In the year 2006 Congress MP and Industrialist Mr. Naveen Jindal, along with another MP Mr. Jaiprakash and MLA Mr. Anand Singh Dangi and DGP Mr. P. V. Rathi with the help of Haryana Police and Muscle men forcefully occupied the Haryana Olympic Bhawan at Panchkula and office of the Haryana Olympic Association and tried to remove Mr. Abhay Singh Chautala from his post. The case is under litigation in the court of Law  However, the Indian Olympic Association stands besides the Haryana Olympic Association headed by Mr. Abhay Singh Chautala, MLA

The forged case against Mr. H. S. Bhadu has been filed by Haryana Police later Mr. Bhadu get bail from High Court  and the honorable High Court of Punjab and Haryana issued notice to IPS Mr. Param Veer Rathi.

On 2 October 2007 Mr. Abhay Singh Chautala re-elected as President of Haryana Olympic Association  and IOA gives its recognition to his re-election. On 25 September 2008 Mr. P V Rathi, IPS elected as President of the other faction of HOA. On 8 October 2008 Panchkula Court restrain Mr. Abhay Singh Chautala to use the name and banner of Haryana Olympic Association. Both the factions went to the IOA with their papers. IOA referred the matter of HOA to Disputes and Affiliation Commission of IOA under Chairmanship of Mr. R. K. Anand, Senior Advocate and President, Jharkhand Olympic Association. After hearing both the factions several times. Mr. R K Anand given his verdict in favour of Mr. Abhay Singh Chautala and he condemns the act of Haryana Government by interfering in the Activities of Haryana Olympic Association (HOA), which hurts the autonomy of State Olympic Association. On 12 February 2011 in the General Body Meeting of IOA held at Ranchi the General House adopted the Report and verdict of Disputes and affiliation Commission of IOA, and once again IOA recognized Mr. Abhay Singh Chautala as President of Haryana Olympic Association.

References

External links 
 Official website

Sports governing bodies in India
Sports organizations established in 1966
1966 establishments in Haryana
Sport in Haryana